Chareh (also Romanized as Chāreh; also known as Chārī) is a village in Ganjafruz Rural District, in the Central District of Babol County, Mazandaran Province, Iran. At the 2006 census, its population was 2,812, in 713 families.

References 

Populated places in Babol County